Oleksandr Borysovych Bakumenko (29 April 1959 – 11 April 2022) was a Ukrainian politician. A member of European Solidarity, he served in the Verkhovna Rada from 2014 to 2019. He died on 11 April 2022 at the age of 62.

References

1959 births
2022 deaths
21st-century Ukrainian politicians
Politicians from Kharkiv
Solidarity Party (Ukraine) politicians
Eighth convocation members of the Verkhovna Rada
Recipients of the Honorary Diploma of the Cabinet of Ministers of Ukraine